The Brass Verdict is the 19th novel by American author Michael Connelly and features the second appearance of Los Angeles criminal defense attorney Michael "Mickey" Haller. Connelly introduced Haller in his bestselling 2005 novel The Lincoln Lawyer.

Plot summary
Since the events of the previous novel, attorney Mickey Haller has spent a year recuperating from his wounds and a subsequent addiction to painkillers. He is called back to the practice of law when an old acquaintance, defense attorney Jerry Vincent, is murdered. Haller inherits Vincent's caseload, which includes the high-profile trial of Walter Elliott, a Hollywood mogul accused of murdering his wife Mitzi and her German lover. Haller secures this "franchise" case, persuading the mogul to keep him on as counsel by promising not to seek a postponement of the trial, which is due to start in nine days.

Meanwhile, maverick LAPD detective Harry Bosch, the main character in several earlier novels written by Connelly, is investigating Vincent's murder. Bosch, warning that Vincent's killer may come after Haller next, persuades the reluctant lawyer to cooperate in the ongoing murder investigation. Meanwhile, Haller shakes off the rust, and lingering self-doubts, as he prepares for the double-murder trial.

Among the cases Haller takes on is that of a former surfing champion, Patrick, who, while addicted to painkillers after a surfing accident, has stolen a diamond necklace while at the home of a friend.  Haller feels sorry for Patrick because of his own history of addiction, and employs the young man to drive his Lincoln.  He manages to get Patrick off the charges against him by playing on a hunch that the stolen diamonds were not genuine.

Assisted by his investigator, Cisco, and his office assistant, Lorna (who is one of Haller's two ex-wives), Haller works out a strategy to defend his client, based on the fact that the gunshot residue found on Elliott's hands is the result of having travelled in a police car used earlier in the day to transport another prisoner.  He also throws doubt as to whether the couple's murderer was actually after Mitzi or her lover.  In the meantime, Walter admits that he is involved with the Mafia and that he believes they murdered both his wife and the lawyer Jerry Vincent.

On the strength of information from Bosch, Haller becomes suspicious that Vincent has bribed someone in the legal process to plant a jury member who would help obtain an acquittal for Walter Elliott, regardless of the evidence.  On investigation, he finds that one of the jurors has stolen someone else's identity, and he ensures that this information becomes known to the judge in the Elliott case, resulting in the trial being brought to a halt just as it begins to go Haller's way.  Elliott, however, confesses to Haller that he actually did kill Mitzi and her lover, and Haller is left pondering on the outcome of the case.  During the evening he receives a call from the police, asking him to help a former client.  When he arrives on the scene, he is attacked by a man who attempts to push him over a precipice.  Bosch and his team, who have been observing Haller, arrive on the scene just in time to prevent the murder, and the attacker is discovered to be the planted juryman.

Haller figures out that the person behind the corruption is in fact a senior judge, and confronts her with his evidence, leading to her arrest by the FBI.  When he learns that Walter Elliott and his secretary have also been murdered, he assumes she is behind that murder, but it turns out that justice has been dispensed by Mitzi's lover's family before their return to Germany.

Unknown to Haller, but revealed in previous Connelly novels, is the fact that Bosch is Haller's half-brother.  Haller works out the puzzle by the end of the book, going mainly on the resemblances between Bosch and his own father (himself a lawyer) but at this point no arrangement is made for the two men to meet again.

Awards
The novel won the 2009 Anthony Award for "Best Novel". It was also nominated for the CWA Ian Fleming Steel Dagger in the same year at the Crime Thriller Awards.

Television series adaptation

On June 25, 2019, it was announced that David E. Kelley had developed and written a television series based on the Haller series with a commitment from CBS. However, on May 2, 2020 it was announced that the pilot would not be moving forward. Netflix subsequently picked up the series and ordered a 10-episode series of The Lincoln Lawyer, with Kelley, on January 11, 2021, based on The Brass Verdict. Filming for the series began on March 31, 2021. On April 6, 2022, the series was given a May 13, 2022 premiere date.

References

2008 American novels
Harry Bosch series
Novels by Michael Connelly
Novels set in Los Angeles
Anthony Award-winning works
Little, Brown and Company books
American novels adapted into television shows